Vibhu Puri is an Indian film director, writer and lyricist.

A gold medalist from the Film and Television Institute of India (FTII), Vibhu Puri's debut feature as a director and producer, Hawaizaada, featuring Mithun Chakraborty and Ayushmann Khurrana. It is the untold story of Shivkar Bapuji Talpade, who is claimed to have been the first to build a plane. In January 2015, the film opened to great reviews by critics, though it did not make a huge impact at the box office. 

Before making his feature, Puri assisted Sanjay Leela Bhansali on various feature films. He also wrote Saawariya, Guzaarish and Shirin Farhad Ki Toh Nikal Padi, all made by SLB Films. To add to it, Puri also penned songs for Guzaarish and Hawaizaada. He also assisted Vishal Bharadwaj on The Blue Umbrella. 

In the world of advertising, he started off as a writer in Contract Delhi before getting into filmmaking. In the last three years, he has been directing commercials. He has directed more than 150 films and has collaborated on campaigns with various agencies like Ogilvy, McCann, Leo Burnett, Scarecrow, Rediff, and Mudra amongst others for major brands like Maggi, HDFC, Reckitt Benckiser, P&G, Zee, Heinz, Star Sports, Dabur, Parle G, Himani, Emami, and Amazon. Puri has made films for Indian, Pakistani and Bangladeshi agencies and brands. Besides Hindi and English, he has made ad films in various languages like Telugu, Malayalam, Haryanvi, and Bangla.

Two of Puri's student films, Chaurus Chaand and Chabiwali Pocket Watch, have traveled to various film festivals in India and abroad. Both of them had the unique distinction of being selected for Indian Panorama. 
Chauras Chaand is an ode to the life and poetry of rebel Punjabi poet Avtar Singh Sandhu ('Pash').
Chabiwali Pocket Watch featured at many festivals including Cannes (where it was awarded Kodak emerging filmmaker of the world, 2006); has won various international awards, and also the national award from the Indian president. The film is set in Old Delhi and deals with story of a romantic Urdu poet now dying anonymously, and the struggle between his daughter and an opportunist publisher. This film was also India's official entry to the Student Oscars, 2006. 

Puri also takes workshops on the subjects of filming music and playback sequences at FTII, Pune and Whistling Woods, Mumbai. He has also taken lectures on film acting at FTTI, Pune and film and management workshop at IIM Udaipur. 

He has also served on the jury of the 57th National Awards, 2009.

Filmography
Hawaizaada (2015) (director, producer, lyrics)
Saawariya (2007) (writer)
Guzaarish (2010) (writer, lyrics)
Shirin Farhad Ki Toh Nikal Padi (2012) (writer)
The Blue Umbrella (2005) (assisted)
Chaurus Chaand (short film)
Chabiwali Pocket Watch (2006) (short film)

References

Hindi-language film directors